Parkland Village is an unincorporated community in Alberta, Canada within Parkland County. It was previously recognized as a designated place by Statistics Canada in the 2001 Census of Canada.

Demographics 

Education 
Parkland Village is home to Parkland Village School. Administered by Parkland School Division No. 70, the school offers instruction to students in kindergarten through grade four. Its catchment area includes Parkland Village, nearby Acheson and surrounding rural areas of Parkland County. The school has a student population of 182.

See also 
List of communities in Alberta
List of designated places in Alberta

References 

Designated places in Alberta
Localities in Parkland County